Zagvozd is a village and a seat of Zagvozd municipality in the Split-Dalmatia County, Croatia. In 2011 it had a population of 767.

Municipality 

Zagvozd is a seat of the municipality of the same name. It includes the villages of: Biokovsko Selo, Krstatice, Rastovac, Rašćane Gornje, Župa, Župa Srednja and Zagvozd. In 2011, the municipality had a population of 1,642 (2001 census), 99% of which are ethnic Croats.

History
From 1941 to 1945, Zagvozd was part of the Independent State of Croatia. In the settlements of Zagvozd and Rastovac, at least 190 lost their lives over the course of the war.

Zagvozd was the site of a 1945 torture and massacre of 18 friars and civilians, committed by Yugoslav Partisans. Their remains were discovered in 2005. DNA analysis in Split revealed the identities of three of the victims as Franciscan friars from the town of Široki Brijeg. In 2007, the 15 unidentified bodies were buried in Zagvozd while the identified friars were buried in their native Široki Brijeg.

Culture 
Zagvozd celebrates its municipal day on July 16 to coincide with the local celebration of the feast of Our Lady of Mount Carmel.

References

Populated places in Split-Dalmatia County
Municipalities of Croatia
!